The De Souza family, otherwise known as the De Sousa family, is a prominent Beninese clan. Its founder, Francisco Felix de Sousa, was the Brazilian-born viceroy of Ouidah in the Kingdom of Dahomey.

History
After immigrating from Bahia in Brazil to coastal Dahomey in the 18th century, Francisco Felix de Sousa began to function as a trader of various goods - chief of which were slaves. 

His activities there made him so influential in Dahomey's affairs that he was recognized by the Dahomeyans as a tribal chief, the chacha of Ouidah, following his support of their ruler King Ghezo in his rise to power. Upon de Sousa's death, the family that he had started with his harem of African consorts continued to be prominent throughout West Africa. The chacha title is still borne by the family's titular leader today. 

According to the De Souza family, Francisco Felix de Sousa was the eighth generation descendant of Tomé de Sousa (1503–1579), a Portuguese nobleman who was the first governor-general of the Portuguese colony of Brazil from 1549 to 1553. If true, it would make the contemporary De Souzas members of the Portuguese nobility in addition to being an African chieftaincy family.

Although the De Souzas are part of the Beninese elite, their position in society is not without controversy. The fact that their founder was reputed by some to be the world's most prolific slavetrader has ensured that there is a great deal of resentment directed towards the family by some of their fellow Beninese. In reference to the family's origins and the anger its history sometimes inspires, current chacha Moise de Souza is quoted as saying:

Notable members
Chantal Yayi
Francisco Felix de Sousa
Isidore de Souza
Marcel Alain de Souza
Martine de Souza
Moise de Souza
Paul Emile de Souza

References

Political families
African royalty
African dynasties